949 Hel (prov. designation:  or ) is a dark background asteroid from the outer regions of the asteroid belt, approximately  in diameter. It was discovered by German astronomer Max Wolf at the Heidelberg Observatory on 11 March 1921. The transitional X-type asteroid has a rotation period of 8.2 hours. It was named in memory of the discoverer, after the Norse goddess of the dead, Hel.

Orbit and classification 

Hel is a non-family asteroid of the main belt's background population when applying the hierarchical clustering method to its proper orbital elements. It orbits the Sun in the outer asteroid belt at a distance of 2.4–3.6 AU once every 5 years and 2 months (1,901 days; semi-major axis of 3 AU). Its orbit has an eccentricity of 0.19 and an inclination of 11° with respect to the ecliptic. The body's observation arc begins at Lowell Observatory on 11 January 1931, almost a decade after its official discovery observation at Heidelberg in March 1921.

Naming 

This minor planet was named from Norse mythology, after Hel, the goddess of the dead and the queen of the underworld. The asteroid's name was proposed by the widow of Max Wolf, who had died two years earlier.

Physical characteristics 

In the Tholen-like taxonomy of the Small Solar System Objects Spectroscopic Survey (S3OS2), Hel is an X-type asteroid, while in the SMASS-like taxonomy of the S3OS2, it is a Xk-subtype that transitions from the X-type to the uncommon K-type asteroids.

Rotation period 

In September 2016, a rotational lightcurve of Hel was obtained from photometric observations by Pedro Brines and colleges of the Spanish group of asteroid observers (OBAS). Lightcurve analysis gave a rotation period of  hours with a brightness variation of  magnitude.

Diameter, mass and albedo 

The Collaborative Asteroid Lightcurve Link derives an albedo of 0.0445 and a diameter of 69.11 km based on an absolute magnitude of 9.8.

An asteroid occultation on 27 October 2005, gave a best-fit ellipse dimension of 69.0 × 69.0 kilometers, while a second occultation event gave an ellipse of 61.0 km × 61.0 km on 3 February 2014, with the latter having a better quality rating. These timed observations are taken when the asteroid passes in front of a distant star.

References

External links 
 Lightcurve Database Query (LCDB), at www.minorplanet.info
 Dictionary of Minor Planet Names, Google books
 Asteroids and comets rotation curves, CdR – Geneva Observatory, Raoul Behrend
 Discovery Circumstances: Numbered Minor Planets (1)-(5000) – Minor Planet Center
 
 

000949
Discoveries by Max Wolf
Named minor planets
19210311